Queen of the Ocean or Ocean Queen or variant, may refer to:

 cruise ship nickname
 ocean liner nickname
 Queen of the Ocean (album) 1998 album by Lana Lane
 Samudra Devi (Sinhala: සමුද්‍ර දේවී ; literally Queen of the Oceans) a regular daily train service in Sri Lanka
  a U.S. sidepaddle wooden steamboat
  (1964) "Ocean Queen", a Siritara Enterprise cruise ship that sunk in 2006

See also
 Queen of the Sea (disambiguation)